I Start Counting is a 1966 thriller novel by the British writer Audrey Erskine Lindop. With a serial strangler on the loose in her small English town, a teenage girl begins to suspect who it is.

In 1970 it was another of Lindop's novels which was adapted into a film of the same title directed by David Greene and starring Jenny Agutter and Simon Ward. Others have been I Thank a Fool, and The Singer Not the Song.

References

Bibliography
 Goble, Alan. The Complete Index to Literary Sources in Film. Walter de Gruyter, 1999.
 Vinson, James. Twentieth-Century Romance and Gothic Writers. Macmillan, 1982.

1966 British novels
British novels adapted into films
British thriller novels
Novels about serial killers
Novels by Audrey Erskine Lindop
William Collins, Sons books